Dybwad or Dybvad is a surname. Notable people with the surname include:

Christoffer Dybvad, (1578–1622), Danish mathematician
Gunnar Dybwad (born 1928), retired Norwegian football forward
Gunnar Dybwad (1909–2001), American professor and advocate for the rights of people with disabilities
Iacob Dybwad Sømme (1898–1944), Norwegian ichthyologist and resistance member
Jacob Dybwad (1823–1899), Norwegian bookseller and publisher, and a pioneer in the Norwegian publishing trade
Johanne Dybwad (alpine skier) (1918–2011), Norwegian alpine skier who competed in the 1936 Winter Olympics
Johanne Dybwad (1867–1950), Norwegian stage actress and stage producer
Jørgen Dybvad, (died 1612), Danish theologian and mathematician of the sixteenth and seventeenth century
Ola Dybwad-Olsen (born 1946), Norwegian former footballer who played as a striker
Vilhelm Dybwad (1863–1950), Norwegian barrister and writer